William of Nottingham, OFM ( or ;  1330  1336) was an English Franciscan friar who served as the seventeenth Minister Provincial of England (–1330).


Life
From 1312 to 1314, William served as the 39th reader at the Franciscan college at Oxford. He later succeeded Richard of Conington, becoming the 17th Minister Provincial of England (–1330). William attended the Franciscan General Chapter in 1322 and had royal permission to travel abroad in 1324 and 1325. In 1330, he was ordered by Pope John XXII to extradict the friars Peter de Saxlingham, John de Hequinton, Henry de Costeseye, and Thomas de Helmedon. They were all arrested at Cambridge on charges of heresy.

William died in Leicester sometime between 1330 and 1336 and was buried in the same Greyfriars cemetery that later held Richard III. For a time, it was thought that his body may have been the one discovered in a double stone-and-lead coffin near Richard III's remains. However, continued investigation established that tomb belonged to an as-yet-unknown elderly woman.

He was succeeded as Minister Provincial by Roger of Denemed.

Works
William was the actual author of the Commentary on the Gospels that was formerly attributed to the earlier William of Nottingham. Based on Clement of Llanthony's One from Four, the postill was well known for centuries and survives in numerous manuscripts.

His Sentences survives in a single copy and preserves various statements made by John Duns Scotus and his classmates while at Oxford, where they immediately preceded William. One section thoroughly and temperately covers the scholastic opinions on the eternity of the world prior to the 1316 disputation, reaching the conservative conclusion that nothing truly infinite exists within God's Creation.

In his capacity as the Franciscan lector at Oxford, he was responsible for copying five large volumes of postills for Sir Hugh of Nottingham, who was a clerk at the Royal Exchequer.

Notes

Gallery

References

Citations

Bibliography
 .
 .
 .
 
 .
 .
 .

External links
 

English Franciscans
Ministers Provincial of England
1330s deaths
Year of birth unknown